Chamberlin is a surname. Notable people with the surname include:
 Ann Chamberlin, (born 1954) American novelist
 Beth Chamberlin (born 1963), American television actress
 Clarence Chamberlin (1893–1976), American aviator
 Donald D. Chamberlin (born 1944), American computer scientist, co-designer of the SQL database language
 Edson Joseph Chamberlin (1852–1924), president of the Grand Trunk Railway
 Edward Chamberlin (1899–1967), American economist
 Frank Chamberlin (1978–2013), American football player
 G. Richard Chamberlin (born 1946), American politician from Georgia
 Guy Chamberlin (1894–1967), American football player
 Harry Chamberlin (1887–1944), Olympic equestrian and US Army brigadier general
 Harry Chamberlin, inventor of the Chamberlin musical keyboard instrument
 Henry Chamberlin (died 1888), member of the New Zealand Legislative Council
 Jan Rooney née Chamberlin, singer and widow of Mickey Rooney
 Jim Chamberlin (1915–1981), Canadian aerodynamicist who worked on the Canadian Avro Arrow, NASA's Gemini spacecraft and the Apollo program
 Jimmy Chamberlin (born 1964), American drummer of The Smashing Pumpkins
 Joseph Conrad Chamberlin (1898–1962), American arachnologist
 Kevin Chamberlin (born 1963), American actor
 Lee Chamberlin (1938–2014), American actress
 Mason Chamberlin (1727–1787), English portrait painter
 Michael Chamberlin (disambiguation)
 Paul Chamberlin (born 1962), American tennis player
 Ralph Vary Chamberlin (1879–1967), American biologist and historian
 Shaun Chamberlin, English author and activist
 Thomas Chrowder Chamberlin (1843–1928), American geologist
 Willard Joseph Chamberlin (1890–1971), American entomologist and World War I pilot
 William Henry Chamberlin (1897–1969), American historian and journalist
 William Henry Chamberlin (philosopher) (1870–1921), Mormon philosopher and theologian

See also 
 Chamberlin (disambiguation)